Darko Jorgić (born 30 July 1998 in Trbovlje) is a Slovenian table tennis player.

He represented his country at the 2020 Summer Olympics in Tokyo.

Career

2021 
Jorgic upset Liam Pitchford in a tight 4–2 match (last four games were all decided by two points) in the round of 32 in the men's singles event at the Tokyo Olympics. In the round of 16, Jorgic pulled off the biggest upset of the tournament as he defeated Tomokazu Harimoto to advance into the quarter-finals.

Overview of titles and successes

Singles

Playing Style 
Jorgic has a unique serve as he likes to serve with his backhand from the far forehand corner. This allows him to give wide angles to his opponent's short forehand and sets up his big backhand for the third ball.

References 

1998 births
Living people
People from Hrastnik
Slovenian male table tennis players
Table tennis players at the 2020 Summer Olympics
Olympic table tennis players of Slovenia
20th-century Slovenian people
21st-century Slovenian people